Mary Doran (September 8, 1910 – September 6, 1995) was an American actress. She appeared in more than 80 films from 1927 to 1944.

Biography

Doran was born in New York and attended public schools there before graduating and going to Columbia University. She left Columbia after three years to pursue a career on stage. She sang and danced in Belle Baker's Betsy when it was in New York. Later, she performed in Flo Ziegfeld's Rio Rita.

Doran's films included Broadway Melody, Half a Bride, and The Trial of Mary Dugan. In 1929, Doran was under contract to Metro-Goldwyn-Mayer.

Personal life

On August 15, 1931, Doran married Joseph Sherman in San Diego, California. Sherman was Metro-Goldwyn-Mayer's chief publicity director.

Partial filmography

 Half a Bride (1928)
 Lucky Boy (1929)
 The Girl in the Show (1929)
 Their Own Desire (1929)
 The Broadway Melody (1929)
 The Trial of Mary Dugan (1929)
 They Learned About Women (1930)
 The Divorcee (1930)
 The Sins of the Children (1930)
 Remote Control (1930)
 The Third Alarm (1930)
 Party Husband (1931)
 Ridin' for Justice (1932)
 The Final Edition (1932)
 Beauty and the Boss (1932)
 The Silver Lining (1932)
 The Strange Love of Molly Louvain (1932)
 Miss Pinkerton (1932)
 Movie Crazy (1932)
 Exposure (1932)
 Breach of Promise (1932)
 Sing Sing Nights (1934)
 Sunset Range (1935)
 Murder in the Fleet (1935) (uncredited)
 Naughty Marietta (1935) (uncredited)
 The Border Patrolman (1936)
 The Bridge of Sighs (1936)

References

External links

1910 births
1995 deaths
20th-century American actresses
Actresses from New York City
American film actresses
American stage actresses
American musical theatre actresses
Ziegfeld girls